Shorecrest High School is a public high school (grades 9 through 12) in Shoreline, Washington, United States, one of two high schools in the Shoreline School District. Shorecrest was founded in 1961.  Its mascot is Otis the Fighting Scot and students refer to themselves as "Scots", or the "Highlanders", a reference to the Clan Gordon.

Demographics
The demographic breakdown of the 1,450 students enrolled for the 2017–2018 school year was:
Male – 50.8%
Female – 49.2%
American Indian/Alaska Native – 0.2%
Asian – 14.3%
Black – 8.7%
Hispanic – 11.0%
Native Hawaiian/Pacific Islander – 0.5% 
White – 52.8%
Two or More Races – 12.5%

In addition, 26.8% of the students were eligible for free or reduced lunch.

Student media

 Tattoo (literary arts magazine)
 The Highland Piper (student newspaper)
 The Loch (annual)
 SCNN/Shorecrest News Network (video news)

Notable alumni

Arts and entertainment
Jeff Kashiwa, jazz musician
Sanjaya Malakar, American Idol contestant (Season 6)
Stephen O'Malley, experimental musician, producer and composer
Richard Sparks, choral conductor
Rainn Wilson, actor
Adam Ray, actor, comedian, podcaster

Athletes
Michelle Akers, professional soccer player, member of 1991 and 1999 U.S. Women's National Teams
Ken Bone, former Washington State University and Portland State University head men's basketball coach
 Tony Crudo, professional soccer player
Jason Farrell, former Major League Soccer and National Professional Soccer League    midfielder with Columbus Crew, Kansas City Attack, and Wichita Wings
Caros Fodor, professional Mixed Martial Artist for WSOF
Allen James, two time Olympian in the 20k, 1992, and 50k walk, 1996.
Phoenix Jones, professional MMA fighter
Charlie McKee, Olympic bronze medalist, 1988 sailing – 470; Olympic bronze medalist, 2000 sailing – 49'er
Jonathan McKee, Olympic gold medalist, 1984 sailing – Flying Dutchman; Olympic bronze medalist, 2000 sailing – 49'er
Ray Pinney, former National Football League offensive lineman with Pittsburgh Steelers
Glendon Rusch, Major League Baseball pitcher, minor-league coach
Sue Semrau, head women's basketball coach at Florida State University
Marc Wilson, former NFL quarterback with New England Patriots, Oakland Raiders
Henry Wingo, professional soccer player, Seattle Sounders FC
Katrina Young, Olympic platform diver at the 2016 and 2020 Olympic Games

Business
Matt Williams,  American Internet entrepreneur and CEO of Pro.com.

Government, law, social activism
Dan Kristiansen, current 39th District Washington State Representative (R)
Michael G. Santos, prison reform activist and author.

Athletics
The following is a listing of the sports offered at Shorecrest and the state tournament championships won.
 Baseball – State champions, 1975.
 Tennis – Boy's state champions, 2015.
 Cross country running – Boy's state champions, 1984, 1985.
 Football
 Volleyball
 Soccer – Boy's state champions, 1976, 2005 and 2009; Girl's state champions 1983, 1985, 1992, 1993 and 1995
 Swimming
 Basketball
 Gymnastics
 Dance (Highland dancing, hip hop)
 Wrestling
 Golf
 Track and field Girl's state champions, 2015.
 Softball – 4A state champions, 2001
 Cheerleading
 Color guard (flag spinning)

References

External links

 Shorecrest High School

Educational institutions established in 1961
High schools in King County, Washington
Shoreline, Washington
Public high schools in Washington (state)
1961 establishments in Washington (state)